Mbam-et-Inoubou is a department of Centre Province in Cameroon. The department covers an area of 7,125 km and as of 2001 had a total population of 153,020. The capital of the department lies at Bafia.

Subdivisions
The department is divided administratively into nine communes and in turn into villages.

Communes 
 Bafia 
 Bokito
 Deuk
 Kiiki
 Kon-Yambetta
 Makénéné
 Ndikiniméki
 Nitoukou
 Ombessa

References

Departments of Cameroon
Centre Region (Cameroon)